Lincoln Lions may refer to:
 Lincoln Lions (rugby union), a rugby union club in England
 Lincoln (Pennsylvania) Lions, the athletic teams for Lincoln University in Pennsylvania